Vincent Planté (born 19 November 1980) is a football goalkeeper coach and a former goalkeeper. He works for Chambly.

During his career he played for Cannes, Caen, Saint-Étienne, Arles-Avignon, Guingamp, Red Star, Poissy, and Chambly. After retiring from his playing career in 2017, Planté became the goalkeeper coach for Chambly. On 17 April 2021, 4 years after his retirement, Planté came off the bench as an emergency goalkeeper in a 2–0 win over Amiens SC.

References

External links
 
 

1980 births
Living people
Footballers from Lille
French footballers
Association football goalkeepers
AS Cannes players
Stade Malherbe Caen players
AS Saint-Étienne players
AC Arlésien players
En Avant Guingamp players
Red Star F.C. players
FC Chambly Oise players
Ligue 1 players
Ligue 2 players
Championnat National players
Championnat National 2 players